Maurice is a novel by E. M. Forster. A tale of homosexual love in early 20th-century England, it follows Maurice Hall from his schooldays through university and beyond. It was written in 1913–1914 and revised in 1932 and 1959–1960. Forster was an admirer of the poet, philosopher, socialist, and early gay activist Edward Carpenter and, following a visit to Carpenter's home at Millthorpe, Derbyshire in 1913, was inspired to write Maurice. The cross-class relationship between Carpenter and his working-class partner, George Merrill, presented a real-life model for that of Maurice and Alec Scudder.

Although Forster showed the novel to a select few of his trusted friends (among them Siegfried Sassoon, Lytton Strachey, Edward Carpenter, Christopher Isherwood, Xiao Qian and Forrest Reid), it was published only posthumously, in 1971. Forster did not seek to publish it during his lifetime, believing it to have been unpublishable during that period owing to public and legal attitudes to same-sex love. A note found on the manuscript read: "Publishable, but worth it?" Forster was determined that his novel should have a happy ending, but also feared that this would make the book liable to prosecution while male homosexuality remained illegal in the UK.

There has been speculation that Forster's unpublished manuscript may have been seen by D. H. Lawrence and influenced his 1928 novel Lady Chatterley's Lover, which also involves a gamekeeper becoming the lover of a member of the upper classes.

The novel has been adapted by James Ivory and Kit Hesketh-Harvey as the 1987 Merchant Ivory Productions film Maurice, for the stage, and as a 2007 BBC Radio 4 Classic Serial by Philip Osment.

Plot summary
Maurice Hall, age fourteen, discusses sex and women with his prep-school teacher Ben Ducie just before Maurice progresses to his public school. Maurice feels removed from the depiction of marriage with a woman as the goal of life.

Some years later, while studying at Cambridge, Maurice befriends a fellow student Clive Durham. Durham introduces him to ancient Greek writings about same-sex love, including Plato's Symposium, and after a short time the two begin a romantic relationship, which continues until they have left university.

After visiting Greece, Durham falls ill; on recovery, he ends his relationship with Maurice, professing he is heterosexual and marrying a woman. Maurice is devastated, but he becomes a stockbroker, in his spare time helping to operate a Christian mission's boxing gym for working-class boys in the East End, although under Clive's influence he has long since abandoned his Christian beliefs.

He makes an appointment with a hypnotist, Mr. Lasker Jones, in an attempt to "cure" himself. Lasker Jones refers to his condition as "congenital homosexuality" and claims a 50 percent success rate in curing this "condition". After the first appointment, it is clear that the hypnotism has failed.

Maurice is invited to stay with the Durhams. There, at first unnoticed by him, is the young under-gamekeeper Alec Scudder (called Scudder for large passages of the book), who has noticed Maurice. One night, a heartbroken Maurice calls for Clive to join him. Believing that Maurice is calling for him, Alec climbs to his window with a ladder and the two spend the night together.

After their first night together, Maurice panics, fearing he will be exposed as a homosexual. Alec is wounded by Maurice's refusal to answer his letters and threatens to expose him. Maurice goes to Lasker Jones one more time. Knowing that the therapy is failing, he tells Maurice to consider relocating to a country where same-sex relationships are legal, such as France or Italy. Maurice wonders if same-sex relationships will ever be acceptable in England to which Lasker Jones replies, "I doubt it. England has always been disinclined to accept human nature."

Maurice and Alec meet at the British Museum in London to discuss the blackmail. It becomes clear that they are in love with each other.

After another night together, Alec tells Maurice that he is emigrating to Argentina and will not return. Maurice asks Alec to stay with him and indicates that he is willing to give up his social and financial position, as well as his job. Alec does not accept the offer. After initial resentment, Maurice decides to bid Alec farewell. He is taken aback when Alec is not at the harbour. In a hurry, he makes for the Durhams' estate, where the two lovers were supposed to have met before at a boathouse. He finds Alec, who assumes Maurice had received the telegram Alec had sent to his residence. Alec had changed his mind and intends to stay with Maurice, telling him that they "shan't be parted no more."

Maurice visits Clive and outlines what has happened with Alec. Clive is left speechless and unable to comprehend. Maurice leaves to be with Alec, and Clive never sees him again.

Original ending
In the original manuscripts, Forster wrote an epilogue concerning the post-novel fate of Maurice and Alec that he later discarded because it was unpopular among those to whom he showed it. This epilogue can still be found in the Abinger edition of the novel, which also contains a summary of the differences between various versions of the novel.

The Abinger reprint of the epilogue retains Maurice's original surname of Hill. (Although the surname had been chosen for the character before Maurice Hill (geophysicist) was even born, it certainly could not be retained once the latter had become a Fellow of King's College, Cambridge, Forster's own College. It might, of course, have been changed before that time.)

The epilogue contains a meeting between Maurice and his sister Kitty some years later. Alec and Maurice have by now become woodcutters. It dawns upon Kitty why her brother disappeared. This portion of the novel underlines the extreme dislike that Kitty feels for her brother. The epilogue ends with Maurice and Alec in each other's arms at the end of the day and discussing seeing Kitty and resolving that they must move on to avoid detection or a further meeting.

Reception
Critical reception in 1971 was, at best, mixed. C. P. Snow, in The Financial Times, found the novel 'crippled' by its "explicit purpose," with the ending "artistically quite wrong" (a near universal criticism at the time). Walter Allen in the Daily Telegraph, characterised it as "a thesis novel, a plea for public recognition of the homosexual," which Forster had "wasted" himself doing, instead of an autobiographical work. For Michael Ratcliffe, in The Times, it stands as "the least poetic, the least witty, the least dense and the most immediately realistic of the six novels." Philip Toynbee, in The Observer, found the novel "deeply embarrassing" and "perfunctory to the point of painful incompetence," prompting him to question "whether there really is such a thing as a specifically homosexual sensibility." Toynbee went on to state that he could "detect nothing particularly homosexual about Maurice other than it happens to be about homosexuals."

Somewhat more positively, Paddy Kitchen, in The Times Educational Supplement, thought that the novel "should be taken on the terms it was conceived and not as some contender to... Howards End." In delineating "a moral theme," Forster is, in Kitchen's view, "the ideal person." V.S. Pritchett, in The New Statesman, found the character of Alec "a good deal better drawn" than Mellors in Lady Chatterley's Lover, although found the dull Maurice, shorn of Forster's "intelligence and sensibility," to be hardly believable. But Cyril Connolly, in The Sunday Times, found "considerable irony" in the fact that it is Maurice, not Clive, the "sensitive young squire," who "turns out to be the incurable."

For George Steiner in The New Yorker, the modest achievement of Maurice served to magnify the greatness of A Passage to India:
Subtlest of all is Forster’s solution of the problem of 'physical realization.' In Maurice, this basic difficulty had lamed him. Unlike Gide or Lawrence, he had found no sensuous enactment adequate to his vision of sex. Gesture recedes in a cloying mist. The mysterious outrage in the Marabar caves is a perfect solution. Though, as the rest of the novel will show, 'nothing has happened' in that dark and echoing place, the force of sexual suggestion is uncompromising. As only a true writer can, Forster had found his way to a symbolic action richer, more precise than any single concrete occurrence.

Adaptations
The novel was made into a film Maurice (1987), directed by James Ivory and starring James Wilby as Maurice, Hugh Grant as Clive, and Rupert Graves as Alec.

A stage adaptation, written by Roger Parsley and Andy Graham, was produced by SNAP Theatre Company in 1998 and toured the UK, culminating with a brief run at London's Bloomsbury Theatre. Shameless Theatre Company staged another production in 2010 at the Above the Stag Theatre in London. Above the Stag staged it again in September/October 2018, as part of the theatre's first season in their new premises. It was directed by James Wilby. The US premiere opened on 24 February 2012 at the New Conservatory Theatre Center in San Francisco.

A retelling and continuation of the novel by William di Canzio, titled Alec, was published in 2021.

See also
 Ernesto, a novel by Umberto Saba written in 1953 and published posthumously in 1975

References

Sources 
 Forster, E. M. Maurice. London: Edward Arnold, 1971.

External links

 
 "Maurice plot summary and links" at Aspects of E. M. Forster.
 "Transvaluing Immaturity: Reverse Discourses of Male Homosexuality in E.M. Forster's Posthumously Published Fiction", Stephen Da Silva, Spring 1998. .
 "Heroes and Homosexuals: Education and Empire in E. M. Forster", Quentin Bailey, Autumn 2002. .
 "Roaming the Greenwood", Colm Tóibín, London Review of Books, Vol. 21 No. 2, 21 January 1999.
 Maurice at the British Library

1910s LGBT novels
1913 British novels
1970s LGBT novels
1971 British novels
Bloomsbury Group in LGBT history
Books about conversion therapy
British LGBT novels
British novels adapted into films
Novels by E. M. Forster
Novels published posthumously
Novels set in University of Cambridge
Novels with gay themes